Stø is a fishing village located on the northern tip of the island of Langøya, along the Gavlfjorden in the Vesterålen archipelago. It is part of the municipality of Øksnes in Nordland county, Norway.  In 2001, there were about 175 residents.  This village was the administrative centre of the old municipality of Langenes which existed from 1919 until 1964.

Tourism
There are two places serving food in Stø. Some of the specialities are whale meat, cod tongues, boknafisk, Arctic char, and soup with salmon and catfish.  Rental cabins and camping areas are available for tourists.

Langenes Church
Langenes Church was built in the 1700s during Norway's Baroque period. It seats 160 people and is one of the oldest wooden churches in Northern Norway.

Bird, seal and whale tours
Daily sea tours are available from May to September.

Anda Island
Birds that can be spotted on the island include the white-tailed eagle (Haliaeetus albicilla), puffin (Fratercula arctica), great cormorant (Phalacrocorax carbo), shag (Phalacrocorax aristotelis), black-legged kittiwake (Rissa tridactyla), common guillemot (Uria aalge) and razorbill (Alca torda).

References

Øksnes
Villages in Nordland
Vesterålen